Political cleansing may refer to:

Party purge, cleansing of a party of perceived undesirables
Political cleansing of population
Decommunization
Denazification